P91 may refer to:

 , a patrol boat of the Royal Australian Navy
 Papyrus 91, a biblical manuscript
 Ruger P91, a pistol
 P91, a state regional road in Latvia